The Iron Man is a 1924 American film serial directed by Jay Marchant and starring Luciano Albertini.

Cast

Chapter titles

 Into the Sewers of Paris
 The Impostor
 The Dynamite Truck
 Wings Aflame
 The False Trail
 The Stolen Passport
 False Faces
 Shadowed
 The Missing Heirloom
 Sinister Shadows
 The Betrayal
 Flames of Fate
 The Crisis
 Hidden Dangers
 The Confession

See also
 List of film serials
 List of film serials by studio

References

External links

1924 films
American silent serial films
American black-and-white films
Universal Pictures film serials
Films directed by Jay Marchant
Films set in Paris
1920s American films